William Horn Cloud (known as William 'Horncloud') was born in 1905 (some sources say 1907), Medicine District, Pine Ridge, Potato Creek, South Dakota and died in 1992. He was born to Joseph Horn Cloud and Mildred Beautiful Bald Eagle. His father Joseph witnessed and survived the Wounded Knee Massacre.

Musical career
Horncloud learned many traditional songs through Lakota elders. He was known in the pow wow circuit as a singer, dancer, orator and interpreter of traditional Lakota songs and culture who greatly contributed to preserving Lakota, Sioux culture and tradition. Johnny Cash would visit with Horncloud and play songs.  Horncloud recorded the album 'Sioux Songs of War and Love' which was released in 1971 on the Canyon Records label [cr-6150], as well as the albums 'Sings Sioux Rabbit Songs' and 'Sioux Love Song/ Rabbit Dance Song'. More recently, Canyon Records released a compact disc entitled 'Traditional Lakota Songs' which has tracks from 'Sioux Songs of War and Love. Both albums contain the track entitled 'Honoring Song' featuring Hornclouds 86-year-old father-in-law Chief Charles Red Cloud of Pine Ridge South Dakota singing his grandfathers song who was Red Cloud (of the Bozeman War 1866-1868) with the words telling the difficulty of being Indian in a white man's world. Also, Horncloud's recording of the traditional Lakota 'love song' is re-worked with added tracks by Kevin Locke (musician) under the title 'Nióiye Wéksuye' from the album 'Lightning and Wind: The Voice and Flute of a Nation' which was promoted by the Lakota Language Consortium.

Family
William Horncloud's father in-law was Oglala Lakota Chief Charles Red Cloud who was the grandson of historical Chief Red Cloud (1822–1909) of Red Cloud's War 1866–1868. Nancy Red Cloud was Chief Charles Red Clouds daughter to whom Horncloud (b.1907) was married and had a daughter named Millie Horn Cloud. Horn Cloud (1839–1890) had two spouses, Yellow Leaf whom he had a child with named Dewey Beard (aka "Iron Hail") . And Horn Clouds other spouse, Nest, who had four children including Joseph Horn Cloud. Joseph had William 'Horncloud' and Jessie with Mildred Beautiful Bald Eagle. Horncloud's father Joseph witnessed and survived the Wounded Knee Massacre at age 16. Horncloud's grandfather, grandmother and Yellow Leaf all died December 29, 1890 at the Wounded Knee Massacre.

References

Lakota leaders
Native American musicians
1900s births
1992 deaths